Anna, Princess of Anhalt-Bernburg (née Countess Anna of Bentheim-Tecklenburg; 4 January 1579 – 9 December 1624) was the consort of Christian I, Prince of Anhalt-Bernburg.

Biography 
Countess Anna of Bentheim-Tecklenburg was born in Bentheim on 4 January 1579 to Arnold III, Count of Bentheim-Steinfurt-Tecklenburg-Limburg and Magdalena of Neuenahr-Alpen.

On 2 July 1595 she married Christian I, Prince of Anhalt-Bernburg in Lorbach. They had sixteen children:
Frederick Christian (b. and d. Amberg, 2 May 1596).
Amalie Juliane (b. Amberg, 10 September 1597 – d. Neinburg, Hannover, 11 August 1605).
Christian II, Prince of Anhalt-Bernburg (b. Amberg, 11 August 1599 – d. Bernburg, 22 September 1656).
Eleonore Marie (b. Amberg, 7 August 1600 – d. Strelitz, 17 July 1657), married on 7 May 1626 to John Albert II, Duke of Mecklenburg-Güstrow.
A daughter (b. and d. Amberg, May? 1601).
Sibylle Elisabeth (b. Amberg, 10 February 1602 – d. Strelitz, 15 August 1648).
Anna Magdalene (b. Amberg, 8 March 1603 – d. 30 October 1611).
Anna Sophie (b. Amberg, 10 June 1604 – d. Bernburg, 1 September 1640).
Louise Amalie (b. Amberg, 14 January 1606 – d. Bernburg, 17 October 1635).
Ernest (b. Amberg, 19 May 1608 – d. Naumburg, 3 December 1632), colonel of a cavalry regiment in Saxon service, fatally wounded at the Battle of Lützen (1632).
Amöena Juliane (b. Amberg, 13 November 1609 – d. Bernburg, 31 July 1628).
Agnes Magdalene (b. Amberg, 8 October 1612 – d. Wildungen, 17 July 1629).
Frederick, Prince of Anhalt(-Bernburg)-Harzgerode (b. Ensdorf, 16 November 1613 – d. Plötzkau, 30 June 1670).
Sophie Margarete (b. Amberg, 16 September 1615 – d. Dessau, 27 December 1673), married on 14 July 1651 to John Casimir, Prince of Anhalt-Dessau.
Dorothea Matilde (b. Amberg, 11 August 1617 – d. Bernburg, 7 May 1656).
Frederick Louis (b. Amberg, 17 August 1619 – d. Harzgerode, 29 January 1621).

In 1603 her husband became the Prince of Anhalt-Bernburg, making her the consort. Anna died on 9 December 1624 in Bernburg. She is buried in the crypt of the Castle Church of St. Aegidien.

References 

1579 births
1624 deaths
Burials at Schlosskirche St. Aegidien (Bernburg)
German countesses
House of Bentheim
Princesses by marriage
Princesses of Anhalt-Bernburg